This is a list of episodes for the 1959–1963 television series The Untouchables, starring Robert Stack as Eliot Ness.

Series overview

Episodes

Pilot (1959)

Season 1 (1959–60)

Season 2 (1960–61)

Season 3 (1961–62)

Season 4 (1962–63)

Home releases
The following DVD sets have been released by Paramount Home Video.

References

External links
 

The Untouchables
Untouchables (1959 TV Series)